Aaron Craig Millbank (born 4 February 1995) is an English footballer who plays as a forward for Deal Town.

Career
Millbank started his career in the youth system of Gillingham and signed a two-and-a-half-year scholarship in 2011, after spending five years with the youth team. In December 2012, Millbank joined Isthmian League Division One South side Herne Bay on a one-month loan. Millbank returned to the "Gills" in January 2012 having made three appearances. In October 2013, Millbank joined Isthmian League Division One South side Ramsgate on work experience. He impressed during his spell with his hometown club, scoring eight goals in 26 appearances. In February 2014, Millbank was recalled by Gillingham for inclusion in the first team squad. Millbank made his professional debut for Gillingham in May 2014, replacing Cody McDonald in a 1–1 draw with Shrewsbury Town. He then went on to sign his first professional contract in the month, on a one-year deal.

In September 2021, he signed for Whitstable Town's rivals Herne Bay, turning down higher wages from elsewhere to sign for the Oystermen and he went straight into the side that beat Corinthian 1–0. On 30 April 2022, Millbank scored as Herne Bay defeated Ashford United in the play-off final to earn promotion to the Isthmian League Premier Division.

On 8 August 2022, Millbank signed for Southern Counties East League Premier Division club Deal Town.

Personal life
Millbank was born in Ramsgate, Kent, and attended St Georges C of E Foundation School in Broadstairs. He is a supporter of West Ham United.

Career statistics

References

External links

1995 births
Living people
People from Ramsgate
Footballers from Kent
English footballers
Association football midfielders
Gillingham F.C. players
Herne Bay F.C. players
Ramsgate F.C. players
Whitstable Town F.C. players
Deal Town F.C. players
English Football League players
Isthmian League players